Roger Toziny (24 December 1883 – 3 March 1939) was a 20th-century French chansonnier, lyricist and actor.

Biography 
On 18 May 1917, released from military service, Roger Toziny joined in Paris with another chansonnier, Maurice Hallé and a cartoonist, Jules Depaquit, to create a satirical four pages weekly entitled La Vache enragée, taking the name of a former .

In February 1921, Roger Toziny and Maurice Hallet founded a new cabaret in Montmartre, at 4 place Constantin-Pecqueur, and gave it the name of their review, La Vache enragée. There he met Pierre Dac, alias André Isaac, who he managed to convince, despite his shyness, to perform on stage, and for who he found his pseudonym "Dac". Other artists made their debut in the venue such as Raymond Souplex or Léo Malet. On 17 avril 1921, Roger Toziny also organized the first "scabs fair" in order to help the needy painters.

When Jules Depaquit died in 1924, he succeeded him as mayor of the "free commune of Montmartre". He later became the boss of another cabaret, Le Caveau des oubliettes rouges, still in Montmartre.

During the 1930s, he played as an actor in films, in particular in a feature film by Marie Epstein and Jean Benoît-Lévy 
Hélène. He is also the author of a collection of old songs of France, entitled Absence or Les chansons de mon âme.

Works 
 À l'heure la plus douce, plaquette de vers, illustrations by Germain Delatousche, 1921
 Montmartre et sa commune libre, photographs by Maurice Chabas, Éditions la Vache enragée, 1934
 De balades en ballades ou Les veillées de Montmartre, edited by Jacqueline Loussert-Toziny, 1990

Filmography 
Under the name Toziny:
 1930: Chiqué by Pierre Colombier with Adrien Lamy
 1932: Monsieur le docteur (short film) by Pablo Labor, with René-Paul Groffe
Under the name Roger Toziny:
 1936: Hélène by Jean Benoît-Lévy and Marie Epstein, with Madeleine Renaud, Jean-Louis Barrault, Maurice Baquet

References

Bibliography 
Noël Laut, « Montmartre-Plage », La Rampe, 20 August 1922, p. 43 read online.
Jean Guérin, Des hommes et des activités : autour d'un demi-siecle, Éditions B.E.B, 1957 (read online, "Toziny (Roger)", p. 672-673.
 Jeffrey H. Jackson, « Artistic Community and Urban Development in 1920s Montmartre », French Politics, Culture & Society, vol. 24, no 2, été 2006, p. 1-25 read online.
Philippe Mellot, La vie secrète de Montmartre, Éditions Omnibus, 2008.
Jacques Pessis, Pierre Dac, mon maître 63, Le Cherche midi, 2012 (read online.

External links 
 
 Roger Toziny on Aquitaine.fr

1883 births
People from Gironde
1939 deaths
French chansonniers
French lyricists
20th-century French male actors
20th-century French male  singers